Trinity Bridge is a unique three-way stone arch bridge that stands at the heart of Crowland, Lincolnshire, England. While it once spanned the confluence of the River Welland and a tributary, the rivers have been re-routed, and it now spans nothing significant.

History
The current bridge dates to the 14th century (built between 1360 and 1390) and replaced previous wooden bridges. The earliest known mention of the bridge is by King Æthelbald of Mercia in 716. In 943 it was mentioned in a charter of Eadred. The bridge is now a scheduled monument and Grade I listed.

The bridge, also known as Croyland Bridge, consists of three gothic arches, and is supposed to have been built in honour of the Trinity, is of an earlier date than the Crusades, the time of building being determined to be of the year 860.

The bridge is predominantly built from Barnack stone, which was quarried about 10 miles to the west of Crowland, and presumably transported by boat on the Welland.

This bridge has three stairways that converge at the top. Originally it spanned the River Welland and a tributary that flowed through the town, although the rivers were re-routed in the mid-seventeenth century and no longer flow anywhere near the bridge. The bridge was an unusual and economical solution to the crossing of two watercourses at their confluence, reducing the need for three separate bridges to a single structure with three abutments.

Dry Bridge in Zrenjanin, Serbia, is another example of a bridge no longer crossing water, but it is far larger.

References

External links 
 Tourism article on Crowland
 
 Report on the repair and stabilisation of Trinity Bridge

Deck arch bridges
Bridges in Lincolnshire
Grade I listed buildings in Lincolnshire
Stone bridges in the United Kingdom
Arch bridges in the United Kingdom
Grade I listed bridges
Three-way bridges
Bridges completed in the 14th century
Pedestrian bridges in England
Crowland